Travis James Wiuff (born March 15, 1978) is an American mixed martial artist currently competing in the Heavyweight division. A professional competitor since 2001 and a longtime veteran of the sport, Wiuff has competed for the UFC, PRIDE, Bellator, World Victory Road, and the Quad Cities Silverbacks and San Jose Razorclaws of the IFL.

Background
Wiuff is from Owatonna, Minnesota, and is of Danish and Irish descent. As his father was a professional wrestler, Wiuff also began wrestling when he was five years old, and continued through high school and college. While at Owatonna High School, he also played football. He was injured during his senior year and had to miss out on the state wrestling championship tournament despite being ranked number one in the state of Minnesota. 

Wiuff continued to wrestle and also continued to play football for two years in junior college, at Rochester Technical Community College, finishing second in the national championship in 1999. After the junior college, Wiuff attended Minnesota State University but dropped out a year before graduating with a law enforcement degree.

Mixed martial arts career

Early career
Applying for a bouncer job in his early adulthood, Wiuff bumped into Brad Kohler who tried to lure the accomplished wrestler into fighting. Over time and several attempts, Kohler succeeded and Wiuff begun training at Kohler's gym Lion's Lair. Rapidly after starting the sport, Wiuff made his professional debut in September 2001. Over the next year, he amassed a record of 12–2 before making his debut for the Ultimate Fighting Championship.

Ultimate Fighting Championship
Wiuff made his UFC debut in November 2002 as he faced Vladimir Matyushenko at UFC 40. He lost the fight via submission due to punches late in the first round. Wiuff was released from the promotion following the loss.

Post-UFC release
Following his release from the company, Wiuff fought schedule on the independent MMA circuit. He fought 24 times over the next three years, and went 22–2.

Return to UFC
Wiuff was invited back to the UFC in April 2005 when he faced Renato Sobral at UFC 52. He lost the fight via armbar submission in the opening minute of the second round. He was again released from the promotion.

Independent Promotions
Wiuff continued his fight schedule after his second UFC release fighting in more independent promotions. Before joining Bellator, he fought 39 times in the ensuing six years. He added an additional 29-9 with one no-contest to his record during this period.

Wiuff won the YAMMA Eight-Man Heavyweight Tournament as well as the IFO Light Heavyweight Championship twice, IFC Americas Cruiserweight Championship and IFC United States Light Heavyweight Championship once.

Wiuff fought Mike Kyle on May 24, 2013, at CFA 11, Wiuff lost via knockout in 21 seconds of the first round.

Bellator Fighting Championships
Wiuff signed to a contract with Bellator. He debuted in October 2011 where he defeated reigning Bellator Light Heavyweight Champion Christian M'Pumbu in a non-title superfight at Bellator 55, marking the first time a reigning Bellator Champion had lost to someone not under an ongoing contract with the promotion. Bellator signed Wiuff to a contract that December, and he returned to the promotion in March 2012 where he defeated Anthony Gomez in a unanimous decision at Bellator 60.

In the summer of 2012, Wiuff entered Bellator's Light Heavyweight Tournament. In the opening round at Bellator 71, he faced Chris Davis and won via KO in the first round. Wiuff faced Tim Carpenter in the semifinals at Bellator 72. He won the fight via unanimous decision.

On August 24, 2012, Wiuff faced Attila Vegh in the tournament finals at Bellator 73 and lost via KO in 25 seconds of round one.

On March 21, 2013, Wiuff faced Ryan Martinez at Bellator 93 in a Heavyweight bout, He lost via KO in 18 seconds of round one.

Independent promotions
Wiuff faced Brett Murphy at VCF: Countdown to War on December 31, 2013. He won the fight via unanimous decision, snapping his four fight losing streak.

Wiuff signed with the Driller Promotions organization in March 2014, and made his debut against Terry Davinney at DP: O-Town Throwdown 1 on April 12, 2014. He won the fight via first-round TKO.

He then faced Brian Heden at Driller Promotions: No Mercy 11 on May 24, 2014, for the DP Heavyweight Championship. He won the fight via first-round TKO, and won his first championship since 2009. He then faced Dallas Mitchell at Dakota FC: Beatdown 11 on June 7, 2014, which he won in a unanimous decision.

Wiuff made his first title defense on June 27, 2014, when he faced Danyelle Williams at Driller Promotions: A-Town Throwdown III. He won the fight via unanimous decision.

Wiuff then faced Chris Barnett at Inoki Genome Fight 2 on August 23, 2014. Wiuff lost the bout via TKO after being struck by a right hand from Barnett.

Wiuff faced Timothy Johnson at Dakota FC 19: Fall Brawl on October 25, 2014, for the DFC Heavyweight Championship. He was defeated via TKO due to punches in the first round.

Wiuff faced Kevin Asplund at Driller Promotions: O-Town Throwdown 2 on April 18, 2015. He won via submission in round three.

Personal life
Wiuff has two daughters.

Wiuff is a special needs teacher and a football and wrestling coach in the Kasson-Mantorville School District.

Championships and accomplishments
Fusion Fight League
FFL Heavyweight Championship (One time, current)
Bellator Fighting Championships
Bellator 2012 Summer Series Light Heavyweight Tournament Runner-Up
Driller Promotions
DP Heavyweight Championship (One time)
YAMMA Pit Fighting
YAMMA 8 Man Heavyweight Tournament Winner
International Fighting Organization
IFO Light Heavyweight Championship (Two times)
International Fighting Championships
IFC Americas Cruiserweight Championship (One time)
IFC United States Light Heavyweight Championship (One time)
International Sport Karate Association
ISKA MMA Light Heavyweight Championship (One time)

Mixed martial arts record

|-
| Win
| align=center|78–22 (1)
| Matt Kovacs
| Submission (arm-triangle choke)
| Fusion Fight League: Fights Under The Lights
| 
| align=center| 2
| align=center| 0:52
| Billings, Montana, United States
|  
|-
| Win
| align=center|77–22 (1)
| Jeremy Speits
| Submission (arm-triangle choke)
| Fusion Fight League: Fights Under The Lights 6
| 
| align=center| 2
| align=center| 1:38
| Billings, Montana, United States
|
|-
| Win
| align=center|76–22 (1)
| JR Lugo
| Decision (unanimous)
| M-1 Global: Road to M-1 USA 2
| 
| align=center| 3
| align=center| 5:00
| Winterhaven, California, United States
|
|-
| Loss
| align=center| 75–22 (1)
| Greg Rebello
| TKO (punches)
| CES MMA 48: Rebello vs. Wiuff
| 
| align=center| 1
| align=center| 0:23
| Lincoln, Rhode Island, United States
|For vacant CES MMA Heavyweight Championship.
|-
| Win
| align=center| 75–21 (1)
| Ron Carter
| Submission (triangle choke)
| KOTC: Equalizer 
| 
| align=center| 1
| align=center| 4:36
| Lac du Flambeau, Wisconsin, United States
|
|-
| Loss
| align=center| 74–21 (1)
| Brian Heden
| KO (punch)
| Driller Promotions: No Mercy 5
| 
| align=center| 1
| align=center| 0:33
| Detroit Lakes, Minnesota, United States
|Lost DP Heavyweight Championship.
|-
| Win
| align=center| 74–20 (1)
| Kevin Asplund
| Submission (north-south choke)
| Driller Promotions: O-Town Throwdown 2
| 
| align=center| 3
| align=center| 2:26
| Owatonna, Minnesota, United States
|
|-
| Loss
| align=center| 73–20 (1)
| Timothy Johnson
| TKO (punches)
| Dakota FC 19: Fall Brawl
| 
| align=center| 1
| align=center| 3:46
| Fargo, North Dakota, United States
| 
|-
| Loss
| align=center| 73–19 (1)
| Chris Barnett
| TKO (punches)
| Inoki Genome Fight 2
| 
| align=center| 2
| align=center| 0:27
| Tokyo, Japan
|Open Weight bout.
|-
| Win
| align=center| 73–18 (1)
| Danyelle Williams
| Decision (unanimous)
| Driller Promotions: A-Town Throwdown III
| 
| align=center| 3
| align=center| 5:00
| Austin, Minnesota, United States
| 
|-
| Win
| align=center| 72–18 (1)
| Dallas Mitchell
| Decision (unanimous)
| EB: Beatdown at 4 Bears 11
| 
| align=center| 3
| align=center| 5:00
| New Town, North Dakota, United States
| 
|-
| Win
| align=center| 71–18 (1)
| Brian Heden
| TKO (punches)
| Driller Promotions: No Mercy 11
| 
| align=center| 1
| align=center| 4:17
| Detroit Lakes, Minnesota, United States
| 
|-
| Win
| align=center| 70–18 (1)
| Terry Davinney
| TKO (punches)
| Driller Promotions: O-Town Throwdown 1
| 
| align=center| 1
| align=center| 3:42
| Owatonna, Minnesota, United States
|
|-
| Win
| align=center| 69–18 (1)
| Brett Murphy
| Decision (unanimous)
| Valhalla Cage Fighting: Countdown to War
| 
| align=center| 3
| align=center| 5:00
| Minneapolis, Minnesota, United States
| 
|-
| Loss
| align=center| 68–18 (1)
| Mike Kyle
| KO (punch)
| CFA 11: Kyle vs. Wiuff 2
| 
| align=center| 1
| align=center| 0:21
| Coral Gables, Florida, United States
| 
|-
| Loss
| align=center| 68–17 (1)
| Ryan Martinez
| KO (punches)
| Bellator 93
| 
| align=center| 1
| align=center| 0:18
| Lewiston, Maine, United States
| 
|-
| Loss
| align=center| 68–16 (1)
| Maro Perak
| Decision (split)
| Abu Dhabi Warriors 1
| 
| align=center| 3
| align=center| 3:00
| Abu Dhabi, United Arab Emirates
|Returned to Heavyweight.
|-
| Loss
| align=center| 68–15 (1)
| Attila Vegh
| KO (punches)
| Bellator 73
| 
| align=center| 1
| align=center| 0:25
| Tunica, Mississippi, United States
| 
|-
| Win
| align=center| 68–14 (1)
| Tim Carpenter
| Decision (unanimous)
| Bellator 72
| 
| align=center| 3
| align=center| 5:00
| Tampa, Florida, United States
| 
|-
| Win
| align=center| 67–14 (1)
| Chris Davis
| KO (punches)
| Bellator 71
| 
| align=center| 1
| align=center| 4:12
| Chester, West Virginia, United States
| 
|-
| Win
| align=center| 66–14 (1)
| Anthony Gomez
| Decision (unanimous)
| Bellator 60
| 
| align=center| 3
| align=center| 5:00
| Hammond, Indiana, United States
|Catchweight (215 lbs) bout.
|-
| Win
| align=center| 65–14 (1)
| Christian M'Pumbu
| Decision (unanimous)
| Bellator 55
| 
| align=center| 3
| align=center| 5:00
| Yuma, Arizona, United States
|Returned to Light Heavyweight.
|-
| Win
| align=center| 64–14 (1)
| Nick Baker
| TKO (punches)
| Extreme Challenge 183
| 
| align=center| 1
| align=center| 2:11
| Black River Falls, Wisconsin, United States
| 
|-
| Win
| align=center| 63–14 (1)
| Richard White
| TKO  (submission to punches)
| CFX: Extreme Challenge on Target
| 
| align=center| 1
| align=center| 3:20
| Minneapolis, Minnesota, United States
| 
|-
| Loss
| align=center| 62–14 (1)
| Tim Hague
| KO (punch)
| AMMA 5: Uprising
| 
| align=center| 1
| align=center| 1:50
| Edmonton, Alberta, Canada
| 
|-
| Win
| align=center| 62–13 (1)
| Josh Barnes
| TKO (punches)
| Moosin: God of Martial Arts
| 
| align=center| 1
| align=center| 0:34
| Worcester, Massachusetts, United States
| 
|-
| Win
| align=center| 61–13 (1)
| Jeff Monson
| Decision (split)
| CFX/XKL: Mayhem in Minneapolis
| 
| align=center| 3
| align=center| 5:00
| Minneapolis, Minnesota, United States
| 
|-
| Win
| align=center| 60–13 (1)
| Chuck Hoskins
| Decision (unanimous)
| Combat USA: 18
| 
| align=center| 3
| align=center| 5:00
| Onalaska, Wisconsin, United States
| 
|-
| NC
| align=center| 59–13 (1)
| Mike Kyle
| NC (punch after the bell)
| KOTC: Vengeance
| 
| align=center| 2
| align=center| 5:00
| Mescalero, New Mexico, United States
| 
|-
| Win
| align=center| 59–13
| Justin Newcomb
| TKO (punches)
| IFC: Wiuff vs. Newcomb
| 
| align=center| 1
| align=center| 1:01
| Green Bay, Wisconsin, United States
| 
|-
| Win
| align=center| 58–13
| Waylon Goldsmith
| Submission (armbar)
| Fight Nation
| 
| align=center| 1
| align=center| 0:20
| Rochester, Minnesota, United States
| 
|-
| Win
| align=center| 57–13
| Tracy Willis
| TKO (submission to punches)
| IFC: Caged Combat
| 
| align=center| 2
| align=center| 1:46
| Penticton, British Columbia, Canada
| 
|-
| Win
| align=center| 56–13
| Chris Barden
| TKO (submission to punches)
| Extreme Challenge 128
| 
| align=center| 1
| align=center| 0:41
| Rochester, Minnesota, United States
| 
|-
| Loss
| align=center| 55–13
| Stanislav Nedkov
| TKO (punches)
| World Victory Road Presents: Sengoku 8
| 
| align=center| 3
| align=center| 0:42
| Tokyo, Japan
|Light Heavyweight bout.
|-
| Win
| align=center| 55–12
| Steve Pilkington
| TKO (punches)
| Extreme Challenge 119
| 
| align=center| 1
| align=center| 4:48
| Rochester, Minnesota, United States
| 
|-
| Loss
| align=center| 54–12
| Muhammed Lawal
| TKO (punches)
| World Victory Road Presents: Sengoku 5
| 
| align=center| 1
| align=center| 2:11
| Tokyo, Japan
| 
|-
| Win
| align=center| 54–11
| Kazuyuki Fujita
| KO (punches)
| World Victory Road Presents: Sengoku 3
| 
| align=center| 1
| align=center| 1:24
| Saitama, Japan
| 
|-
| Win
| align=center| 53–11
| Chris Tuchscherer
| Decision (unanimous)
| YAMMA Pit Fighting 1
| 
| align=center| 3
| align=center| 5:00
| Atlantic City, New Jersey, United States
| 
|-
| Win
| align=center| 52–11
| Ricco Rodriguez
| Decision (unanimous)
| YAMMA Pit Fighting 1
| 
| align=center| 1
| align=center| 5:00
| Atlantic City, New Jersey, United States
|YAMMA Heavyweight Tournament Semifinal.
|-
| Win
| align=center| 51–11
| Marcelo Donald Pereira
| Decision (unanimous)
| YAMMA Pit Fighting 1
| 
| align=center| 1
| align=center| 5:00
| Atlantic City, New Jersey, United States
|YAMMA Heavyweight Tournament Quarterfinal.
|-
| Win
| align=center| 50–11
| Jesse Veium
| TKO (punches)
| IFO: Fireworks in the Cage IV
| 
| align=center| 1
| align=center| 3:25
| Las Vegas, Nevada, United States
| 
|-
| Win
| align=center| 49–11
| Travis Fulton
| TKO (punches)
| Smash: MMA
| 
| align=center| 2
| align=center| 3:27
| Virginia, United States
| 
|-
| Win
| align=center| 48–11
| Wade Hamilton
| TKO (punches)
| WFC: Downtown Throwdown
| 
| align=center| 1
| align=center| 0:50
| Minneapolis, Minnesota, United States
| 
|-
| Win
| align=center| 47–11
| Sean Salmon
| Submission (guillotine choke)
| IFO: Wiuff vs. Salmon
| 
| align=center| 1
| align=center| 3:37
| Las Vegas, Nevada, United States
| 
|-
| Win
| align=center| 46–11
| Ralph Kelly
| TKO (submission to punches)
| CCCF: Red River Riot 2
| 
| align=center| 3
| align=center| 0:45
| Thackerville, Oklahoma, United States
| 
|-
| Loss
| align=center| 45–11
| Jared Hamman
| KO (punches)
| rowspan="2"|IFC: Global Domination 2
| rowspan="2"|
| align=center| 2
| align=center| N/A
| rowspan="2"|Marksville, Louisiana, United States
| 
|-
| Win
| align=center| 45–10
| Josh Bennett
| KO (punches)
| align=center| 1
| align=center| N/A
| 
|-
| Win
| align=center| 44–10
| Arthur Cesar
| Submission
| IFC: Caged Combat
| 
| align=center| 2
| align=center| 3:09
| Corpus Christi, Texas, United States
| 
|-
| Loss
| align=center| 43–10
| James Lee
| Submission (guillotine choke)
| PRIDE 33
| 
| align=center| 1
| align=center| 0:39
| Las Vegas, Nevada, United States
|Catchweight (210 lbs) bout.
|-
| Win
| align=center| 43–9
| Jason Guida
| Decision (unanimous)
| Xtreme Fighting Organization 14
| 
| align=center| 3
| align=center| 5:00
| Mokena, Illinois, United States
| 
|-
| Win
| align=center| 42–9
| Wojtek Kaszowski
| Decision (unanimous)
| IFL: Gracie vs. Miletich
| 
| align=center| 3
| align=center| 4:00
| Moline, Illinois, United States
| 
|-
| Loss
| align=center| 41–9
| Devin Cole
| Decision (unanimous)
| IFL: Championship 2006
| 
| align=center| 3
| align=center| 4:00
| Atlantic City, New Jersey, United States
|Heavyweight bout.
|-
| Loss
| align=center| 41–8
| Alex Schoenauer
| Submission (heel hook)
| IFL: Legends Championship 2006
| 
| align=center| 2
| align=center| 3:23
| Atlantic City, New Jersey, United States
| 
|-
| Loss
| align=center| 41–7
| Marvin Eastman
| Decision (majority)
| Elite Fighting 1: Supremacy
| 
| align=center| 4
| align=center| 5:00
| Vancouver, British Columbia, Canada
| 
|-
| Win
| align=center| 41–6
| Fabiano Capoani
| KO (punches)
| Battle at the Boardwalk (Day 1)
| 
| align=center| 3
| align=center| 4:54
| Atlantic City, New Jersey, United States
| 
|-
| Win
| align=center| 40–6
| Ron Fields
| TKO (submission to elbows)
| Coliseum 2
| 
| align=center| 2
| align=center| 2:50
| Rochester, Minnesota, United States
| 
|-
| Win
| align=center| 39–6
| Jimmy Westfall
| Submission (armbar)
| Extreme Challenge 65
| 
| align=center| 1
| align=center| 2:56
| Medina, Minnesota, United States
| 
|-
| Loss
| align=center| 38–6
| Jason Lambert
| KO (punches)
| Freestyle FC 15: Fiesta Las Vegas
| 
| align=center| 1
| align=center| 3:19
| Las Vegas, Nevada, United States
| 
|-
| Win
| align=center| 38–5
| William Hill
| TKO (doctor stoppage)
| IFC: Rock N' Rumble
| 
| align=center| 1
| align=center| 5:00
| Reno, Nevada, United States
| 
|-
| Win
| align=center| 37–5
| Matt Horwich
| Decision (unanimous)
| Extreme Challenge 62
| 
| align=center| 3
| align=center| 5:00
| Medina, Minnesota, United States
| 
|-
| Win
| align=center| 36–5
| Ramazan Akhadullaev
| Decision (unanimous)
| Euphoria: USA vs. Russia
| 
| align=center| 3
| align=center| 5:00
| Atlantic City, New Jersey, United States
| 
|-
| Loss
| align=center| 35–5
| Renato Sobral
| Submission (armbar)
| UFC 52
| 
| align=center| 2
| align=center| 0:24
| Las Vegas, Nevada, United States
|Light Heavyweight debut.
|-
| Win
| align=center| 35–4
| Antoine Jaoude
| Decision (unanimous)
| Euphoria: USA vs World
| 
| align=center| 3
| align=center| 5:00
| Atlantic City, New Jersey, United States
| 
|-
| Win
| align=center| 34–4
| Ibragim Magomedov
| Decision (unanimous)
| Euphoria: Road to the Titles
| 
| align=center| 3
| align=center| 5:00
| Atlantic City, New Jersey, United States
| 
|-
| Win
| align=center| 33–4
| Josh Hendricks
| TKO (submission to punches)
| Extreme Challenge 59
| 
| align=center| 1
| align=center| 4:22
| Medina, Minnesota, United States
| 
|-
| Win
| align=center| 32–4
| Ruben Villareal
| Submission (keylock)
| Xtreme Kage Kombat: Eastc Side Rumble
| 
| align=center| 2
| align=center| N/A
| St. Paul, Minnesota, United States
| 
|-
| Win
| align=center| 31–4
| John Dixon
| TKO (cut)
| Extreme Challenge 58
| 
| align=center| 1
| align=center| 2:33
| Medina, Minnesota, United States
| 
|-
| Win
| align=center| 30–4
| Leopoldo Montenegro
| KO (slam and punches)
| Jungle Fight 2
| 
| align=center| 1
| align=center| 4:33
| Manaus, Brazil
| 
|-
| Win
| align=center| 29–4
| Demian Decorah
| TKO (punches)
| Extreme Challenge 56
| 
| align=center| 1
| align=center| 2:20
| Medina, Minnesota, United States
| 
|-
| Win
| align=center| 28–4
| Roman Zentsov
| TKO (cut)
| Euphoria: Russia vs USA
| 
| align=center| 2
| align=center| 2:46
| Atlantic City, New Jersey, United States
| 
|-
| Win
| align=center| 27–4
| Carlos Barreto
| Decision (unanimous)
| Heat FC 2: Evolution
| 
| align=center| 3
| align=center| 5:00
| Natal, Brazil
| 
|-
| Win
| align=center| 26–4
| Nate Sauer
| KO (slam)
| Red Wing Rumble
| 
| align=center| 1
| align=center| N/A
| Minnesota, United States
| 
|-
| Win
| align=center| 25–4
| Travis Fulton
| Decision (split)
| Iowa Challenge 11
| 
| align=center| 3
| align=center| 3:00
| Iowa, United States
| 
|-
| Win
| align=center| 24–4
| Mark Tullius
| Decision (unanimous)
| CFM: Octogono Extremo
| 
| align=center| 3
| align=center| 4:00
| Monterrey, Mexico
| 
|-
| Win
| align=center| 23–4
| Royce Louck
| TKO (punches)
| IFA: Summer Bash
| 
| align=center| 2
| align=center| 1:49
| Minnesota, United States
| 
|-
| Win
| align=center| 22–4
| Greg Wikan
| Decision (unanimous)
| Ring of Fire 9: Eruption
| 
| align=center| 3
| align=center| 5:00
| Baraboo, Wisconsin, United States
| 
|-
| Win
| align=center| 21–4
| Tony Mendoza
| Submission (forearm choke)
| Victory Fighting 5
| 
| align=center| 2
| align=center| 1:00
| Council Bluffs, Iowa, United States
| 
|-
| Win
| align=center| 20–4
| DR Williams
| TKO (submission to punches)
| IFA: Explosion
| 
| align=center| 3
| align=center| 0:43
| Minnesota, United States
| 
|-
| Win
| align=center| 19–4
| Chad Rafdel
| TKO (submission to punches)
| IFA: Clash of the Champions
| 
| align=center| 2
| align=center| 0:27
| Owatonna, Minnesota, United States
| 
|-
| Win
| align=center| 18–4
| Royce Louck
| TKO (submission to punches)
| Bar Room Brawl 10
| 
| align=center| 1
| align=center| 1:11
| United States
| 
|-
| Win
| align=center| 17–4
| DR Williams
| TKO (punches)
| Bar Room Brawl 5
| 
| align=center| 1
| align=center| 3:48
| United States
| 
|-
| Loss
| align=center| 16–4
| Kauai Kupihea
| KO (punch)
| Rumble on the Rock 2
| 
| align=center| 1
| align=center| 4:21
| Hilo, Hawaii, United States
| 
|-
| Win
| align=center| 16–3
| Andy Montana
| Decision (unanimous)
| Rage in the Cage 45: Finally
| 
| align=center| 3
| align=center| 3:00
| Phoenix, Arizona, United States
| 
|-
| Win
| align=center| 15–3
| Royce Louck
| TKO (submission to punches)
| Bar Room Brawl 1
| 
| align=center| 1
| align=center| 1:49
| United States
| 
|-
| Win
| align=center| 14–3
| Buddy Lewis
| TKO (submission to punches)
| Tennessee Shooto: Conquest
| 
| align=center| 2
| align=center| 2:55
| Clarksville, Tennessee, United States
| 
|-
| Win
| align=center| 13–3
| Brian Shepard
| TKO (submission to punches)
| International Cage Combat 1: Retribution
| 
| align=center| 1
| align=center| 4:00
| Minneapolis, Minnesota, United States
| 
|-
| Loss
| align=center| 12–3
| Vladimir Matyushenko
| TKO (submission to punches)
| UFC 40
| 
| align=center| 1
| align=center| 4:10
| Las Vegas, Nevada, United States
| 
|-
| Win
| align=center| 12–2
| Jason Godsey
| Decision
| Ultimate Wrestling: Godsey vs Wiuff
| 
| align=center| 4
| align=center| 5:00
| Minneapolis, Minnesota, United States
| 
|-
| Win
| align=center| 11–2
| Johnathan Ivey
| Decision
| Ultimate Wrestling: Minnesota
| 
| align=center| 3
| align=center| 5:00
| Minneapolis, Minnesota, United States
| 
|-
| Win
| align=center| 10–2
| Travis Fulton
| Decision (unanimous)
| Iowa Challenge 5
| 
| align=center| 3
| align=center| 5:00
| Iowa, United States
| 
|-
| Win
| align=center| 9–2
| Kevin Jordan
| Decision (unanimous)
| Ultimate Wrestling
| 
| align=center| 3
| align=center| 5:00
| Minneapolis, Minnesota, United States
| 
|-
| Win
| align=center| 8–2
| Tom McCloud
| TKO (punches)
| Victory Fighting Championships 1
| 
| align=center| 1
| align=center| 0:35
| Iowa, United States
| 
|-
| Loss
| align=center| 7–2
| Wesley Correira
| TKO (knees)
| SB 24: Return of the Heavyweights 2
| 
| align=center| 3
| align=center| 1:40
| Honolulu, Hawaii, United States
| 
|-
| Win
| align=center| 7–1
| Chad Rafdel
| Submission (keylock)
| rowspan="2"|Ultimate Wrestling: St. Cloud 2
| rowspan="2"|
| align=center| 1
| align=center| 1:40
| rowspan="2"|St. Cloud, Minnesota, United States
| 
|-
| Win
| align=center| 6–1
| Josh Mueller
| TKO (submission to punches)
| align=center| 1
| align=center| 0:32
| 
|-
| Win
| align=center| 5–1
| Chad Rafdel
| Submission (keylock)
| rowspan="2"|Ultimate Wrestling: Rumble at the Jungle
| rowspan="2"|
| align=center| 1
| align=center| 1:00
| rowspan="2"|Minnesota, United States
| 
|-
| Win
| align=center| 4–1
| Chad Brady
| TKO (punches)
| align=center| 1
| align=center| 0:22
| 
|-
| Loss
| align=center| 3–1
| Mike Radnov
| TKO (cut)
| rowspan="2"|Extreme Challenge 46
| rowspan="2"|
| align=center| 1
| align=center| 5:00
| rowspan="2"|Clive, Iowa, United States
| 
|-
| Win
| align=center| 3–0
| Keith Jardine
| KO (punch)
| align=center| 1
| align=center| 0:06
| 
|-
| Win
| align=center| 2–0
| Lenn Walker
| TKO (submission to punches)
| Ultimate Wrestling: New Blood
| 
| align=center| 1
| align=center| 1:15
| Minnesota, United States
| 
|-
| Win
| align=center| 1–0
| Jeff Greer
| TKO (submission to punches)
| Ultimate Wrestling: Rumble in Ramsey 1
| 
| align=center| 1
| align=center| N/A
| Ramsey, Minnesota, United States
|

References

External links

1978 births
Living people
American male mixed martial artists
Light heavyweight mixed martial artists
Heavyweight mixed martial artists
Mixed martial artists from Minnesota
American practitioners of Brazilian jiu-jitsu
Super heavyweight mixed martial artists
Mixed martial artists utilizing collegiate wrestling
Mixed martial artists utilizing Brazilian jiu-jitsu
American male sport wrestlers
Amateur wrestlers
People from Owatonna, Minnesota
Rochester Yellowjackets (NJCAA) football players
People from Rochester, Minnesota
Ultimate Fighting Championship male fighters